Cardiosyne is an extinct genus of beetles from the Triassic of Argentina. It was originally tentatively classified in Elateridae, but in 2020 it was transferred to Coleoptera incertae sedis.

Species

Cardiosyne obesa
It is the type species of the genus. The type specimen is an elytron with record number PULR-I 324. Its type locality is Picos Gemelos (5th cycle), which is in a Carnian lacustrine - large claystone in the Los Rastros Formation of Argentina.

Cardiosyne elegans
The type specimen is an elytron with record number PULR-I 312. Its type locality is Rio Gualo (5th cycle), which is in a Carnian lacustrine - large claystone in the Los Rastros Formation of Argentina.

References

External links 

 
 

Prehistoric beetle genera
Fossil taxa described in 2006